Alf's Imperial Army, founded in 1972, by Ian Brackenbury Channell (who was later appointed Wizard of New Zealand) is New Zealand's longest-running and largest pacifist warfare organisation. Organised loosely along military lines, it has Regiments in several New Zealand towns and cities. As a self declared "army" it exists to do "battle" using strictly non-harmful weapons, following the rules and conventions of the pastime known as "pacifist warfare". Alf's have held many highly publicised battles against a wide range of New Zealand organisations and community groups.

Pacifist Warfare
 
Alf's Imperial Army is a proponent of "pacifist warfare" and fights its battles using strictly non-harmful weapons, such as newspaper swords and cardboard shields for personal duelling. 'Mass effect' weapons such as water bombs, flour bombs, porridge bombs, funnelators (huge slingshots), and meths mortars armed with soft or rotten fruit are also used (though water or flour bombs are the most common). 'Psychological Weapons' such as the dreaded Can-Can charge, heavy duty assault poetry, mass singing and vicious taunting are also permissible.

Aside from being a soldier, participants in a pacifist battle (usually organised into "armies") may have roles such as scout, magician, witch, official scribe, photographer, or whatever other roles may be called for by the mythos of a particular group or particular battle. The most indispensable role however is that of nurses/medics/surgeons who bring the "dead" back to life by dispensing "medicine" (often candy) or "elixirs" (usually port wine, but may be simply water).

Battles usually take place in public places and are intended as a kind of theatrical event that is fun for the participants and exciting and funny for the audience. As such, there is no fixed way of determining who won a pacifist battle, and often two sides may agree to disagree so as to have an excuse to have another battle. Often who "won" may depend upon who tells the best story afterward, who writes the best history afterward, who the audience best remembers afterward, or sometimes the entire story and organisation of the battle may have been pre-scripted beforehand.   

Pacifist Warfare is not a form of historical re-enactment. The armies' uniforms and weapons are not historically accurate, nor are battles any attempt to re-enact any past event.

Pacifist Warfare originated before Live Roleplaying. Participants in a pacifist battle are not playing a particular character, rather they are playing a role in a performance. They also do not have hit-points.

History

Alf's Imperial Army, along with the concept of pacifist warfare, was created by The Wizard of New Zealand in 1972 at the University of Melbourne in Australia. Pacifist warfare was brought to New Zealand in 1973 when Colonel Catford, a follower of the Wizard, moved to New Zealand and founded The 1st Canterbury Crusaders Regiment (later renamed the 1st Canterbury Light Infantry) in Christchurch and organised the first pacifist battle at the city's University of Canterbury. Colonel Catford later moved to Wellington and took the name 'Duke of Wellington', which title was confirmed by mayor Michael Fowler in 1981. Colonel Catford died in November 2014 after a long battle with cancer. 

By late 2011 the Army had reduced its public engagements and based its activities largely off-campuses. Active regiments are still present in Auckland, Christchurch, Hamilton, Oamaru and Wellington, with detachments in Dunedin and Tākaka. The Wizard of New Zealand still performs the role of Generalissimo of Alf's Imperial Army, and is its Supreme Commander.

Mythos and activities

The mythos and uniform of Alf's Imperial Army is of 19th century Victorian British soldiers. The Army therefore is strongly monarchist and does battle in the name of King Charles the Third. Their costumes closely resemble the uniforms of the British Army, in particular the redcoats circa 1881.

Being monarchist, Alf's Imperial Army often battles groups of self-proclaimed Republicans. One example is The Battle for Oamaru, which took place in October 2000, when the Army fought against about 40 New Zealand Green Party members calling themselves "Green Republicans" who assembled in Oamaru under Field Marshal Keith Locke, their Commander in Chief. According to the Greens, all those on the Alf side "committed suicide".

Alf's Imperial Army has battled against many different groups, including political parties, the NZ Police, student clubs and student hostels, The Outward Bound organisation, community organisations, Sea Cadets, schools, TV stations, nudists, and other pacifist warfare groups. One of their major rivals was the McGillicuddy Highland Army. On 31 December 2007 Alf's Imperial Army won a victory in a battle in Oamaru against the Clan McGillicuddy and their "Martian" allies.

Since the inception of Alf's Imperial Army, other similar pacifist warfare groups—many of them unaffiliated to Alf's—have been established around New Zealand, including the McGillicuddy Highland Army, the Waitati Militia, and the Czarist Russian influenced First Lindskii Regiment.

Regiments
Below is a list of Alf's Imperial Army regiments; those still active are bolded.

References

External links

 History page from Christchurch Library website
 1st Canterbury Light Infantry Regiment (Christchurch)
 5th Waikato Dragoons Regiment (Hamilton)

New Zealand culture
1972 establishments in New Zealand
Culture jamming
Live-action role-playing games